Llanglydwen railway station served the village of Llanglydwen, Carmarthenshire, Wales, from 1875 to 1963 on the Whitland and Cardigan Railway.

History 
The station was opened on 12 July 1875 by the Whitland and Taf Vale Railway. It was situated south of a junction in between two minor roads. The original station only had a wooden shed as a station building. A new station was built in 1886. This had a two-storey station building, incorporating the station master's house, the booking office and a waiting room. The down platform had a timber waiting shelter. Behind this platform was the goofs yard, which had one siding. Access to this was enabled by the signal box, which also controlled the level crossing and was at the south end of the up platform. There was also a busy coal yard near the station. The station closed to passengers on 10 September 1962 but remained open for goods until 27 May 1963. The coal depot closed on 2 February 1963.

References 

Disused railway stations in Pembrokeshire
Railway stations in Great Britain opened in 1875
Railway stations in Great Britain closed in 1962
1875 establishments in Wales
1963 disestablishments in Wales